is a creativity video game released for the Nintendo 64 in 1998 exclusively in Japan. With a variety of photo retouching and image composition functions, SmartMedia storage card slots, and planned 64DD floppy disk compatibility, the game was intended to supplant Japan's small and reluctantly growing market for personal computers.

Gameplay
Gameplay consists of puzzles that the system constructs from images, encouraging user-generated content. The player can compose a unique image using the included Mario series clip art, borders, fonts, and other graphics. The composition's layout can become a postcard, name card, poster, or a TV slideshow series.

To facilitate such compositions, the user can optionally exchange Exif images with any other SmartMedia device via the two card slots on the top of the game cartridge. Images can be imported from a personal computer or camera and retouched into the game's compositions. Completed compositions can be exported to a personal computer, or Fuji printing kiosk such as at a shopping mall. Four optional SmartMedia cards were produced separately and specifically intended for use with the game, preloaded with video game themed graphics files: Sylvanian Families, Bomberman, Yoshi, and The Legend of Zelda. In 2017, a hobbyist modified the game to remove the severely limiting requirement of the now obsolete and deteriorated SmartMedia cards.

Development

The game's development was a joint effort supervised by Nintendo which contributed some character graphics, the prominent computer memory manufacturer Hagiwara Syscom for the game software, electronics makers Datt Japan and Tokyo Electron for integrating the SmartMedia slot into Nintendo's Game Pak cartridge design, and printer maker Fuji Photo Film Co., Ltd.

On December 2, 1997, Mario no Photopi was preannounced with optional compatibility with the 64DD floppy drive at a time when the drive was expected to launch in March 1998. Compared to a SmartMedia card's then-typical 2MB, the 64MB floppy disk was intended to hold a user's entire photo album and therefore further supplant the Japanese user's need to buy a less desirable personal computer and printer. The 64DD's drastic launch delays forced the removal of all 64DD functionality from the game. From September 30 to October 3, 1998, the game was publicly demonstrated at Hagiwara Syscom's booth at World PC Expo '98.

Release
As a nonstandard cartridge uniquely containing the only SmartMedia interface to the Nintendo 64 platform, the cartridge has a model number of NUS-023.

Reception
At the World PC Expo '98 prerelease demonstration, Kumio Yamada of PC Watch expressed mistrust of the product's file format in favor of an open standard like JPEG. He praised the convenience of the gamepad driven user interface for image slideshows and management, and he especially  enjoyed editing custom photos with Nintendo's characters.

In 2017, Jason Johnson of Vice retrospectively called the game "one part Photoshop, one part Mario Paint". He said its obscurity makes it "a piece of Nintendo lore" and "something of a holy grail among collectors".

See also

 Mario Paint
 Mario Artist
 Game Boy Camera

References

1998 video games
Nintendo 64-only games
Nintendo 64 games
Japan-exclusive video games
Single-player video games
Mario puzzle games
Video games developed in Japan